The 2022 Shreveport mayoral election took place on November 8, 2022, with a runoff election on December 10 because no candidate obtained a majority of the vote in the first round. It selected the next mayor of Shreveport, Louisiana. Incumbent Democratic mayor Adrian Perkins sought re-election to a second term in office, but finished fourth in the general election. Former Shreveport City Councillor Tom Arceneaux, a Republican, and Louisiana state senator Gregory Tarver, a Democrat, advanced to the runoff election. Besides Perkins, other candidates eliminated in the general election include Caddo Parish Commission president Mario Chavez and city councillor LeVette Fuller.

In the runoff, Perkins and the two previous mayors of Shreveport, all black Democrats, endorsed Arceneaux, a white Republican, over Tarver, a black Democrat. They emphasized that their endorsement was based on personality rather than politics and that they believed Arceneaux to be best for the job. However, they also criticized Tarver for voting against the Justice Reinvestment Act, a 2017 sentencing reform bill championed by Louisiana governor John Bel Edwards. Tarver was endorsed by other prominent Democrats, including Edwards and former mayor Keith Hightower, as well as Republicans including Louisiana Senate president Page Cortez.

The runoff was hotly contested, with both men facing attack ads over accusations of domestic violence against them in the past. Tarver was also criticized because he lived outside of Shreveport until 2021 and his wife received $600,000 in contracts from riverboat casinos that he helped bring to the city. Tarver and Arceneaux denied wrongdoing in all cases and called for the outside groups running the negative ads to pull them from the air. A crucial issue in the race was crime. Tarver was described as running a "tough on crime" campaign and said he would gather law enforcement agencies to develop a plan for reducing violent crime, while Arceneaux believed the best strategy to reduce crime was to improve neighborhoods affected by blight, and proposed imposing liens on blighted property to encourage the owners to improve or sell them.

Arceneaux won the runoff election with 56% of the vote to 44% for Tarver. This was the first Shreveport mayoral race won by a Republican since 1994.

Candidates

Democratic Party
Perkins was initially disqualified from the race by the First District Court of Louisiana for listing the incorrect address on his notice of candidacy. However, the Louisiana Supreme Court overturned that ruling and allowed Perkins's candidacy to continue in a 4-3 decision, ruling that answering certain questions incorrectly on a notice of candidacy is not grounds for immediate disqualification.

Declared
LeVette Fuller, Shreveport City Councillor
Tracy Mendels, former police officer and U.S. Army seargent
Adrian Perkins, incumbent mayor
Gregory Tarver, Louisiana state senator
Darryl Ware, former volunteer for the Elizabeth Warren 2020 presidential campaign

Republican Party

Declared
Tom Arceneaux, attorney and former Shreveport City Councillor
Melvin Slack, evangelist

Withdrew
Jim Taliaferro, at-large Caddo Parish commissioner and candidate for mayor in 2018 (running for city council)

Independents

Declared
Mario Chavez, president of the Caddo Parish commission
Julius Romano

Libertarian Party

Declared
Lauren Ray Anderson, attorney

General election

Results

Runoff

Endorsements

Results

References

Shreveport
Government of Shreveport, Louisiana
2022 Louisiana elections
December 2022 events in the United States